Mats van Kins (born 17 December 1998) is a Dutch footballer who plays as a midfielder.

Professional career
Van Kins joined ADO Den Haag in the summer of 2017 from amateur team RCL in Leiderdorp as an attacking midfielder for the second team, and on 27 October 2017 signed his first professional contract for 3+1 years. Van Kins made his professional debut for ADO Den Haag in the 88th minute of a 4–0 Eredivisie win over PEC Zwolle on 22 December 2017.

In February 2020 it was confirmed, that van Kins would move to VV Noordwijk from the upcoming season.

References

External links
 
 
 Eredivisie Profile

Living people
1998 births
People from Leiderdorp
Association football defenders
Dutch footballers
ADO Den Haag players
VV Noordwijk players
Eredivisie players
Derde Divisie players
Footballers from South Holland